Banksia fasciculata is a species of column-shaped shrub that is endemic to Western Australia. It has hairy stems, crowded, prickly leaves, yellow flowers and hairy fruit.

Description
Banksia fasciculata is a column-shaped shrub that typically grows to a height of  but does not form a lignotuber. The flowers are borne on a head containing between forty and sixty flowers in each head.

Taxonomy and naming
This banksia was first formally described in 1996 by Alex George in the journal Nuytsia from specimens he collected near Harrismith, and given the name Dryandra fasciculata. In 2007, Austin Mast and Kevin Thiele transferred all the dryandras to the genus Banksia and this species became Banksia fasciculata. The specific epithet (fasciculata) is a Latin word meaning "clustered" or "in bundles" referring to the crowded leaves and flowering heads.

Distribution and habitat
Banksia fasciculata grows in mallee-kwongan between Corrigin and Kukerin in the Avon Wheatbelt and Mallee biogeographic regions.

Conservation status
This banksia is classified as "Priority Three" by the Government of Western Australia Department of Parks and Wildlife meaning that it is poorly known and known from only a few locations but is not under imminent threat.

References

fasciculata
Plants described in 1996
Endemic flora of Western Australia
Taxa named by Alex George
Taxa named by Kevin Thiele